Heritage is the fifteenth studio album by American band Earth, Wind & Fire, released in February 1990 on Columbia Records, and was their final release of new music for the label. The album reached No. 19 on the US Billboard Top R&B Albums chart and No.18 on the UK Blues & Soul Top British Soul Albums chart. Heritage also got to No. 39 on the German Pop Albums chart and No. 31 on the Japanese Oricon Albums Chart.

Overview
Heritage was produced by Maurice White. White stated in an interview with the Associated Press that tributes are paid to Fats Waller and Charlie Parker on the album. He also added "The album was a germ in my mind, its very interesting watching it evolve and come to fruition. It starts as an idea, and all of a sudden its a giant thing. I was thinking, first of all of musical heritage, the things we had drawn from. And we wanted to bring to our fans attention things to appreciate, things to be drawn from." 
As well Heritage features guest appearances by artists such as Wanda Vaughn and Jeanette Hawes of The Emotions, Sly Stone, MC Hammer and The Boys.

Singles
The title track features The Boys and reached No. 5 on the Billboard R&B Singles chart. The single, "For the Love of You" featuring MC Hammer, peaked at No. 19 on the same chart.

Samples
"Daydreamin'" was sampled by Nas on the song "Pray" from his 1999 album I Am... and 4 Hero on the song "Journey from the Light".

Critical reception

People described Heritage as an album "with a full dose of energy and creativity". J.D. Considine of The Baltimore Sun declared "Earth, Wind & Fire has not only kept its sound current, but on Heritage actually seems invigorated by the process of change".
Don Palmer of Spin noted "EWF's newest kicks with some genuine enthusiasm". John Milward of Rolling Stone called Heritage "an album that finds these soulful survivors proving that their old-fashioned strengths can still sound fresh in the most modern sense of the word". Simon Witter of NME wrote "Celebrity sidetracks aside, 'Heritage' is virtually flawless". Witter summed up his review of the album by exclaiming " 'Heritage' is a stunning album, a triumph of talent and creative openness over fickle fashion and the ravages of time." Paul Robicheau of The Boston Globe also described Heritage as a "fresh and funky outing". 
As well Lynden Barber of The Sydney Morning Herald placed Heritage at No. 7 on his list of the top ten albums of 1990.

Track listing

Personnel

Philip Bailey -	lead and backing vocals
Gary Bias -	tenor saxophone
Frankie Blue -	guitar
The Boys	
Oscar Brashear -	trumpet, flugelhorn
Robert Brookins - synthesizer, keyboards
Ray Brown -	trumpet
Sonny Emory -	drums
Jeanette Hawes - 	background vocals
Charles L. Freeman - A&R Administration/Production Coordinator
Jerry Hey	- trumpet
Josie James -	background vocals
Ralph Johnson	- percussion
MC Hammer	- rap
Mike McKnight	- synthesizer
Bill Meyers	- synthesizer, keyboards
Les Pierce	- synthesizer, drums, keyboards
Ian Prince	- synthesizer, keyboards
Sheldon Reynolds	- guitar, background vocals
Billy Savage	- synthesizer, keyboards
Dick Smith	- guitar
Michael "Patches" Stewart	- trumpet
Sylvester "Sly Stone" Stewart	- background vocals
Wanda Vaughn	- background vocals
Maurice White	- percussion, lead and backing vocals, kalimba
Verdine White	- bass
Andrew Woolfolk	- alto & tenor saxophones
Billy Young	- synthesizer, keyboards
Reggie C. Young	- trombone

Charts

Weekly charts

Year-end charts

Accolades

References

1990 albums
Earth, Wind & Fire albums
Albums produced by Maurice White
Columbia Records albums
New jack swing albums